Ivano-Kazanka is a rural locality (a selo) and the administrative centre of Ivano-Kazansky Selsoviet, Iglinsky District, Bashkortostan, Russia. The population was 421 as of 2010. There are 14 streets.

Geography 
Ivano-Kazanka is located 28 km south of Iglino (the district's administrative centre) by road. Bratsky is the nearest rural locality.

References 

Rural localities in Iglinsky District